Diego Robert Pishinin Mendes (born January 1, 1988), sometimes known as just Diego, is a former Brazilian football player.

Career 
Diego Pishinin started his youth career as footballer at São Caetano in 2003 when he was 14. After having signed a contract with São Vicente A.C. in August 2008, he moved to Thailand in November 2008 where he joined Chonburi FC in off season. After two-month training with the club he was loaned to Sriracha FC with the beginning of 2009 and finally signed a permanent contract with the 2010 season.

He has helped his new side to win the Thai Division 1 title in 2010 and getting promoted to the TPL

In a game against Phuket FC in September 2013, Diego Pishinin made his 150 overall appearance for Sriracha FC.

Honours

Sriracha FC
Thai Division 1 League: 2010

References

1988 births
Living people
Brazilian footballers
Expatriate footballers in Thailand
Brazilian expatriate sportspeople in Thailand
Diego Pishinin
Diego Pishinin
Diego Pishinin
People from Santo André, São Paulo
Association football defenders
Footballers from São Paulo (state)

GOAT